Ebrahim Abarghouei (born March 6, 1985) is a former Iranian footballer.

Club career

Assist Goals

References

Living people
Shahrdari Tabriz players
Iranian footballers
Fajr Sepasi players
Persian Gulf Pro League players
Azadegan League players
1985 births
Association football defenders
People from Shiraz
Sportspeople from Fars province
21st-century Iranian people